Christine Marie Berkhout (13 July 1893, Malang – 18 November 1932) was a mycologist. She described the genus Candida in her doctoral thesis for the University of Utrecht in the Netherlands in 1923. This event was later described as marking "the beginning of the rational systematics of the anascosporogenous yeasts".

See also
List of mycologists

References

1893 births
1932 deaths
Dutch mycologists
People from Malang
Utrecht University alumni
Women mycologists